The Haryana Legislative Assembly election, 2009 was held on 13 October 2009, to select the 90 members of the Haryana Legislative Assembly. Results were declared on 22 October 2009. Indian National Congress got 40 seats. Incumbent Chief Minister Bhupinder Singh Hooda was reelected for second term.

Results
The results were declared on 22 October 2009.

Elected members

See also
 Elections in Haryana
 2009 elections in India

References

2009
2009
2009 State Assembly elections in India